Dynemicin A  is an anti-cancer enediyne drug. It displays properties which illustrate promise for cancer treatments, but still requires further research.

History and background 
Dynemicin A was first isolated from the soil in the Gujarat State of India. It was discovered to be the natural product of the indigenous bacteria Micromonospora chersina. The natural product displays a bright purple color due to the anthraquinone chromophore structure within it. Initially, this compound was isolated for its aesthetic properties as a dye until further research demonstrated its anti-cancer properties.  Shortly after the compound's discovery, the Bristol-Myers Pharmaceutical Company elucidated the structure in Japan using X-ray diffraction studies of triacetyldynemicin A; a closely related compound.

Synthesis 
The first reported chemical synthesis of dynemicin was accomplished by Myers and coworkers.

Biosynthesis 
Dynemicin A is an antitumor natural product isolated from Micromonospora chersina which causes DNA strand cleavage.  Iwasaki et al. first studied the biosynthetic pathway of Dynemicin A by 13C NMR labeling experiments.  Dynemicin A is thought to be biosynthesized separately from two different heptaketide chains originated from seven head-to-tail coupled acetate units, which is then connected to form Dynemicin A. Initially, precursors such as 3 and 4 were proposed to derive from the oleate/crepenynate pathway, as initially put forth for NSC Chrom A biosynthesis. However, recent work by Thorson and coworkers revealed the biosynthesis of the dynemicin enediyne core to be catalyzed by an enediyne polyketide synthase (PKSE) similar to that employed in calicheamicin biosynthesis.

Mechanism of action 
Dynemicin A is specific for B-DNA, and functions by intercalating into the minor groove of the double helix. For intercalation to occur, the separation between strands, which is usually 3-4 angstroms, needs to be widened to 7-8 angstroms to allow enough space for the ligand to bind. Given this, the DNA must be strained to accommodate the Dynemicin A, resulting in an induced fit-like process.  Once intercalated within the DNA, the epoxide is activated in one of two ways. First, if NADPH or a thiol reduces the molecule the Bergman re-cyclization of the enediyne proceeds. Second, if a nucleophilic mechanism is utilized then the retro-Bergman re-cyclization of the enediyne is used. The final products of these two mechanisms are outlined below. When the re-cyclization occurs, the conformational changes and chemical reactions taking place result in an irreversible double stranded cleavage of the DNA, leading to cell death. During in vitro studies, the molecule showed an increased affinity for the specific 10 base pair sequence CTACTACTTG.  However, in vivo studies have yet to confirm this phenomenon. Professor Martin Semmelhack of Princeton University was the first person to propose the NADPH reduction pathway.

Pharmacological properties 
The pharmacological properties of this drug have not yet been fully explored but currently suggest that it may be a more potent anti-cancer agent than other chemotherapeutic drugs.  The bacterium is believed to use dynemicin A as an antibacterial agent to help it survive in its niche in the environment.  Dynemicin A, as a drug, specifically targets B-DNA and is most effective in rapidly dividing cells. The broad spectrum of the drug prevents current use because it creates unwanted damage in normal healthy tissues. In vivo studies in mice and rats suggest that the treatment is most effective in leukemia, breast, and lung cancers. Synthetic alternatives which are more specific to cancer cells and leave healthy tissues unharmed are being researched. Other animal models are available, but have proven ineffective and therefore have no human trials currently underway.  The enediyne property of this drug relates to another antibiotic known as neocarzinostatin which is approved for clinical use.  As with dynemicin A, neocarzinostatin also interacts with DNA.

References

Notes 
 ElSohly, Adel. "Dynemicin A: Molecule in Review." Columbia University. 12 June 2009.
 
 Nicolaou, K. C., S. A. Snyder, A. G. Meyers, and S. J. Danishefsky. "Dynemicin A." Classics in Total Synthesis II: More Targets, Strategies, Methods. Weinheim: Wiley-VCH, 2003. 75–107.
 Schulz-Aellen, Marie-Françoise. "Cancer Drugs." Aging and Human Longevity. Boston: Birkhäuser, 1997. 203-04
 Silverman, Richard B. "Dynemicin A." The Organic Chemistry of Drug Design and Drug Action. Amsterdam: Elsevier Academic, 2004. 381-85

External links 
 https://web.archive.org/web/20100626231055/http://www.columbia.edu/cu/chemistry/groups/synth-lit/MIR2009/2009_06_12-AElsohly-Dynemycin.pdf
 http://www.pdb.org/pdb/explore/pubmedArticle.do?structureId=2XFL#
 https://books.google.com/books?id=PE587tLs3w0C&pg=PA76&lpg=PA76&dq=Bristol-Myers+structure+dynemicin+a&source=bl&ots=X-l9kgIwfu&sig=H6RCeET9W75_KSupYJhxx3gYRsc&hl=en&ei=_CG6TdWJL8rz0gHYusRt&sa=X&oi=book_result&ct=result&resnum=5&ved=0CDgQ6AEwBA#v=onepage&q=Bristol-Myers%20structure%20dynemicin%20a&f=false
 https://books.google.com/books?id=7l6IOF2t3vIC&pg=PA203&lpg=PA203&dq=where+does+dynemicin+a+come+from&source=bl&ots=fcczlI2BvW&sig=mUWUqTwG283RgGvAxUARhqMJNcw&hl=en&ei=GKe0TabeNouO0QGSwPSfCQ&sa=X&oi=book_result&ct=result&resnum=1&ved=0CBYQ6AEwAA#v=onepage&q=dynemycin&f=false
 https://web.archive.org/web/20120405090957/http://smu.edu/catco/pdf/jacs_127_9469.pdf
 https://web.archive.org/web/20121001181112/http://smu.edu/catco/pdf/JPC-B_111_8321.pdf
 http://www.britannica.com/EBchecked/media/81/Examples-of-anthraquinone-pigments
 http://www.chem.strath.ac.uk/people/academic/tell_tuttle/research/qmmm

Cancer research
Enediynes
Angucyclines
Carboxylic acids
Epoxides
Triols
Nitrogen heterocycles
Heterocyclic compounds with 7 or more rings
Ten-membered rings